Kalaleh County is in Golestan province, Iran. The capital of the county is the city of Kalaleh. At the 2006 census, the county's population was 149,857 in 31,475 households. The following census in 2011 counted 110,473 people in 28,483 households, by which time Marvel Tappeh District had been separated from the county to form Maraveh Tappeh County. At the 2016 census, the county's population was 117,319 in 32,998 households.

Administrative divisions

The population history and structural changes of Kalaleh County's administrative divisions over three consecutive censuses are shown in the following table. The latest census shows two districts, five rural districts, and two cities.

References

 

Counties of Golestan Province